Kotshila Junction railway station is a railway station of Adra railway division of the South Eastern Railway zone of the Indian Railways. It serve the nearby area of Kotshila town in the Purulia district in the Indian state of West Bengal.

History
The -wide narrow-gauge Purulia–Ranchi line was opened by Bengal Nagpur Railway in 1907.

The construction of the -long broad-gauge Chandrapura–Muri–Ranchi–Hatia line was started in 1957 and was completed in 1961. The construction of this line included the conversion of the narrow-gauge Kotshila–Ranchi line to broad gauge.

The narrow gauge Purulia–Kotshila sector was converted to broad gauge in 1992.

Electrification
The Purulia–Kotshila  sector was electrified in 1998–99.

Facilities 
The major facilities available at Kotshila Junction station are waiting rooms, computerised reservation facility, drinking water, reservation counter and vehicle parking. The station also has toilets.

Platforms
There are 3 platforms and 4 tracks. The platforms are connected by foot overbridge.

Station layout

References

Railway stations in Purulia district
Adra railway division